James Herbert (1660–1704), of Tythrop House, Kingsey, Buckinghamshire, was an English politician.

Herbert was the son of the Hon. James Herbert and his wife Jane née Spiller. He married Lady Catherine Osborne, the daughter of Thomas Osborne, Earl of Danby on 1 July 1674. They had three sons and four daughters.

Career
He was a Member (MP) of the Parliament of England for Queenborough in the periods 14 April 1677 – 8 January 1681 and 1689–1690, for Westbury from 1685 to 1687, and for Aylesbury in 1695 – 11 November 1704.  His election in Aylesbury in 1695 was controversial: he secured a majority of 16 votes over his rival Simon Mayne, but complaints were brought to the House of Commons that unqualified persons had voted while others had been bribed to vote for Herbert.  The complaints were not upheld, and Herbert remained the MP for Aylesbury.

References

1660 births
1704 deaths
People from Buckinghamshire
English MPs 1661–1679
English MPs 1679
English MPs 1680–1681
English MPs 1685–1687
English MPs 1689–1690
English MPs 1695–1698
English MPs 1698–1700
English MPs 1701
English MPs 1701–1702
English MPs 1702–1705